Thomas James Van Norman was a Democratic member of the South Dakota House of Representatives, representing the 28A district from 2000 to 2008.

External links
South Dakota Legislature - Tom Van Norman official SD House website

Project Vote Smart - Representative Thomas J. Van Norman (SD) profile
Follow the Money - Thomas J Van Norman
2006 2004 2002 2000 campaign contributions

Members of the South Dakota House of Representatives
1964 births
Living people
People from Elmhurst, Illinois
People from Eagle Butte, South Dakota